Abir (अबीर), is the traditional name given to the powder which is black in colour used for the typical Hindu rituals.

Arabic name meaning "fragrance, aroma." Hebrew name means "Strong; Brave".

Abir may also refer to:

Arabic female name
 Abir Al-Tabbaa, professor of Geotechnical Engineering
 Abir Muhaisen (born 1973), adopted daughter of King Hussein of Jordan
 Abir Al-Sahlani (born 1976), Swedish-Iraqi politician
 Abir Moussi (born 1975), Tunisian lawyer and politician
 Abir Muhaisen, adopted daughter of King Hussein of Jordan

Hebrew male name
 Abir Sultan (born 1985), Israeli photographer 
 Abir Har Even (born 1947), Israelian chess player
 Abir Kara (born 1983), Israeli businessman and politician

Bengali male name
 Abir Chatterjee (born 1980), Indian actor
 Abir Goswami (1976–2013), Indian actor 
 Abir Biswas, Indian politician 
 Abir Hossain Angkon, Bangladeshi film actor

Other people
 Abir Igamberdiev (born 1959), Russian-Canadian theoretical biologist and plant scientist

Other uses
 Abir Congo Company
 AIL Abir or "warrior", an Israel Defense Forces M462 military truck 
 Abir, a martial arts discipline taught by Yehoshua Sofer

See also
 Abeer (disambiguation), an Arabic feminine name meaning "fragrance"